Mephisto or Mephistopheles is one of the chief demons of German literary tradition.

Mephisto or Mephistopheles may also refer to:

Film and television 
 Méphisto, a 1931 French film
 Mephisto (1981 film), a German-Hungarian film based on Klaus Mann's novel Mephisto
 Mephistopheles, an antagonist in the film Ghost Rider
 Dr. Mephesto, a mad scientist in the South Park TV series
 Mephistopheles (Xena), a villain in the Xena: Warrior Princess TV series
 Mephisto, a character on the Australian television series, Double the Fist
 Mephisto, a character in the anime Suite PreCure
 Mephisto Pheles, a son of Satan in the manga/anime Blue Exorcist
 Mephisto, a character in the feature art film The Last Faust
Mephisto, a 1912 British silent film written by Leedham Bantock and directed by Alfred de Manby and F. Martin Thornton

Gaming 
 Mephisto (automaton), a chess-playing pseudo-automaton
 Mephisto (chess computer), a line of chess computers sold by Hegener & Glaser
 Mephistopheles (Dungeons & Dragons), a character in Dungeons & Dragons
 Mr. Mephisto, an early video game
 Mephisto, a character in the Diablo series
 Mephisto (crossword), a long-running competition in the Sunday Times, set by various compilers

Literature and publications 
 Mephisto (comics), a supervillain in the Marvel Comics universe
 Mephisto (novel), a novel by Klaus Mann
 Mefisto, a novel by John Banville
 Mephisto, a Japanese literary magazine which publishes the winner of the Mephisto Prize
 Mephisto or Mephi, a freedom-fighting organization in the 1920 novel We by Yevgeny Zamyatin

Music 
 Mefisto (band), a Swedish black metal band
 Mephisto Waltzes (1859–1885), waltzes by Franz Liszt
 Mefistofele (1868), an opera by Italian composer Arrigo Boito
 "Mephisto", a song by[Moonspell from the 1996 album Irreligious
 "Mephisto", a song by Klaus Schulze from the 2005 album Moonlake
 Mephisto, a character in the two-part rock opera by Kamelot, Epica and The Black Halo
 "Mephistopheles", a song by Deicide from the album Deicide
 "Mephisto", a song by Bushido from the 2018 album Mythos; see Bushido discography

Vehicles 
 Mephisto (tank), a First World War German tank preserved in Australia
 Mephistofeles (car), a one-off racing car created by Ernest Eldridge
 VCAC Mephisto, a French anti-tank guided missile carrier

Other uses 
 Mephisto (fish), a genus of fish in the family Triacanthodidae
 Mephisto (wrestler), a Mexican wrestler
 Mephisto, musician and songwriter for Demonic Resurrection
 Northern pudú (Pudu mephistophiles), the smallest species of deer in the world

See also 
 Mr. Mistoffelees, a black cat in T.S. Eliot's Old Possum's Book of Practical Cats and in the musical Cats